Monica Niculescu was the defending champion, but she lost in the second round to Margarita Gasparyan.

Ekaterina Alexandrova won the title after defeating Evgeniya Rodina 6–2, 6–2 in the final.

Seeds

Draw

Finals

Top half

Bottom half

Qualifying

Seeds

Qualifiers

Lucky loser

Qualifying draw

First qualifier

Second qualifier

Third qualifier

Fourth qualifier

External links
 Main draw
 Qualifying draw

Open de Limoges - Singles
Open de Limoges